Copperhill is a city in Polk County, Tennessee, United States. The population was 443 at the 2020 census. It is included in the Cleveland Metropolitan Statistical Area.

History
Copperhill is located in a geological region known as the Copper Basin, which was the site of a major copper mining operation between the 1840s and 1987.

Starting around the time of the Civil War, the production method for removing the Sulphur from the copper ore mined in the area required building bonfires, throwing in the ore, and burning off the Sulphur.  This necessitated cutting most of the trees in the valley for the bonfires.  The acid rain caused by the burning of the Sulphur inhibited additional vegetation from growing, and the topsoil consequently washed off the hilly terrain due to lack of vegetation to hold it.  Though acid plants were later built to convert the Sulphur into a useful product, the result of the earlier activities was that for years, up until the 1980s, the area was denuded of any greenery, and the red clay soil remaining gave it a Martian appearance.  The area has now been greatly reforested, due to a multimillion-dollar effort by the successor companies to the original copper company.  The copper and acid plants have been permanently closed and most of the plant infrastructure already removed and sold overseas.  Much of the scrap metals from the site have been removed and sold to China.  Glenn Springs Holdings has cleaned and purified all the surrounding creeks and waterways, and water quality is now back to near pristine condition according to published EPA and Tennessee Department of Environmental Conservation studies.

The town these days is a tourist attraction, with near daily rail excursions from Blue Ridge, Georgia, on the Blue Ridge Scenic Railway, and near daily rail excursions from The Gee Creek Wilderness on the Hiwassee River train route.  Whitewater rafting on the Ocoee River also attracts many people and other outdoor activities such as Mountain Biking and Hiking are also popular in the area. The area was the host for the whitewater portion of the 1996 Summer Olympics.

Geography
Copperhill is located at  (34.992108, -84.374254), situated in extreme southeast Tennessee, bordering North Georgia.

Its twin city is McCaysville, Georgia, with the two situated as a single town aligned along a northwestward-flowing river, known as the Toccoa River in Georgia, and the Ocoee River in Tennessee, rather than the east/west state line, which cuts diagonally across streets (where it is marked with a blue line) and through buildings. There is a main downtown area, which the town shares with McCaysville, and it retains a historic feel of when it was thriving.  The main street through town is Ocoee Street (Tennessee State Route 68) which becomes Toccoa Street (Georgia State Route 60) to the east-southeast in McCaysville. A truss bridge over the river at the state line links them to Blue Ridge Drive (Georgia 5) to the south-southwest.

In the early morning hours of February 16, 1990, a major flood struck the towns, although it is now hard to see any damage from this flooding.  The upstream Blue Ridge Dam was raised several feet by the Tennessee Valley Authority, thus greatly minimizing any potential future possible occurrence of flooding.  There have been no further incidents with the river flooding.

As a result of the state line, homes and businesses on the Copperhill side of town have area code 423, while those on the McCaysville side have area code 706.

Demographics

2020 census

As of the 2020 United States census, there were 443 people, 184 households, and 97 families residing in the city.

2000 census
As of the census of 2000, there were 511 people, 239 households, and 146 families residing in the city. The population density was 271.9 people per square mile (104.9/km2). There were 274 housing units at an average density of 145.8 per square mile (56.3/km2). The racial makeup of the city was 97.46% White, 0.20% Native American, and 2.35% from two or more races. Hispanic or Latino of any race were 0.98% of the population.

There were 239 households, out of which 20.9% had children under the age of 18 living with them, 46.4% were married couples living together, 10.5% had a female householder with no husband present, and 38.5% were non-families. 34.7% of all households were made up of individuals, and 18.4% had someone living alone who was 65 years of age or older. The average household size was 2.14 and the average family size was 2.73.

In the city, the population was spread out, with 18.2% under the age of 18, 8.4% from 18 to 24, 23.7% from 25 to 44, 29.4% from 45 to 64, and 20.4% who were 65 years of age or older. The median age was 44 years. For every 100 females, there were 79.3 males. For every 100 females age 18 and over, there were 79.4 males.

The median income for a household in the city was $25,313, and the median income for a family was $28,365. Males had a median income of $23,125 versus $18,542 for females. The per capita income for the city was $15,677. About 8.7% of families and 10.7% of the population were below the poverty line, including 5.3% of those under age 18 and 14.7% of those age 65 or over.

Climate
The climate in this area is characterized by hot, humid summers and generally mild to cool winters.  According to the Köppen Climate Classification system, Copperhill has a humid subtropical climate, abbreviated "Cfa" on climate maps.

See also
Copper Basin (Tennessee)

Burra Burra Mine (Tennessee)

References

External links

City website
City charter
The News Observer

Cities in Tennessee
Cities in Polk County, Tennessee
Cleveland metropolitan area, Tennessee
Copper Basin (Tennessee)
Mining communities in Tennessee